Jan Siewert (born 23 August 1982) is a German professional football manager and former player who played as a defensive midfielder. He became the Academy Manager at Mainz 05 in July 2020.

Playing career
Born in Mayen, Siewert played as a defensive midfielder for TuS Mayen. He retired at the age of 22 due to injury.

Coaching career

Early career
Siewert trained at the Hennes-Weisweiler-Akademie. After working as the assistant manager for the German under-17 and under-18 national teams, Siewert signed a 3-year contract to become manager of German fourth-tier side Rot-Weiss Essen in June 2015. He was sacked by the club in April 2016 after the club entered the relegation zone. Siewert then became assistant manager of VfL Bochum, manager of the VfL Bochum under-19 team, and manager of Borussia Dortmund II.

Huddersfield Town
In January 2019 he was linked with the vacant manager's position at Premier League club Huddersfield Town, and later that month he was appointed to the role, signing a contract until the summer of 2021. In doing so he became the third Borussia Dortmund II manager in a row to leave that role to work in England; after David Wagner (who he replaced at Huddersfield) and Daniel Farke (who became manager of Norwich City). Siewert stated that he did not wish to be compared to Wagner, his predecessor at Huddersfield. Huddersfield were relegated to The Championship in March 2019 with six games remaining joining Ipswich Town and Derby County as being the only Premier League teams to have been relegated so early in the season. Huddersfield gained one point from their first three league games in the 2019–20 season and were knocked out of the EFL Cup first round by Lincoln City and on 16 August 2019, after one win during 19 games in charge, Siewert was sacked. He later said that he "left his heart" at Huddersfield.

Return to Germany
On 1 July 2020 he became the Academy Manager at 1. FSV Mainz 05. On 28 December 2020, Siewert was appointed as interim manager of Mainz's first team in the Bundesliga after Jan-Moritz Lichte was dismissed. He managed one game before being replaced.

Personal life
As of January 2020 Siewert was married with a three-year-old son. At that time the family were still living near Huddersfield.

Managerial statistics

References

External links

1982 births
Living people
People from Mayen
Footballers from Rhineland-Palatinate
German footballers
Association football midfielders
TuS Mayen players
German football managers
Rot-Weiss Essen managers
Borussia Dortmund II managers
Huddersfield Town A.F.C. managers
1. FSV Mainz 05 managers
Premier League managers
English Football League managers
Bundesliga managers
German expatriate football managers
German expatriate sportspeople in England
Expatriate football managers in England
VfL Bochum non-playing staff
1. FSV Mainz 05 non-playing staff